The LFG Roland Pfeilflieger, (Arrow-flyer), was a German swept wing, single engine, two seat biplane built in Germany in 1914.  It made one distinguished long duration flight and served in colonial German South-West Africa.

Design and development

Just before World War I the term Pfeilflieger was used to describe a category of biplanes with swept back wings, a feature adopted to provide some automatic stability.  At least six other manufacturers (Ago, DFW, Harlan, Lohner Daimler, Sommer and Union) as well as LFG designed and built them, though some had less sweep than others. Most had Pfeilflieger in their name.

The LFG Arrow was amongst the more strongly swept of the class. It had wings of unequal span, with ailerons only on the overhung upper planes. There was marked  dihedral on the lower wing but none on the upper. With three pairs of long interplane struts on each side, the LFG was a three bay biplane with a large interplane gap. It could be powered either by a  Mercedes D.I water cooled six cylinder inline engine or by a four-cylinder inline Argus As I engine of the same output.

The fuselage was flat sided and rectangular in section, with the engine exposed in the nose and the passenger/observer's cockpit immediately behind it. In some engine installations the radiator was mounted along the fuselage side, with this cockpit between them.  The pilot's cockpit, fitted like the passenger's with a celluloid windscreen, was much further aft at about mid-fuselage with the main fuel tank between them.  Because the LFG had a very broad chord, low aspect ratio horizontal tail of the sort known at the time as "Taube type", he sat not far in front of its leading edge. The tailplane carried an undivided elevator. There was a triangular fin and a high, rounded and balanced rudder.  The Arrow had a fixed, conventional undercarriage with V-form struts, their leading members bent round into short skids laterally connected by a rod to which the wheels, on their single axle, were joined via rubber shock absorbers.

Operational history

Before the outbreak of World War I Bernard Langer flew a Roland Pfeilflieger, equipped with a Mercedes engine and extra tankage in place of the passenger, on a non-stop sixteen-hour flight. During the war at least one LFG Roland Pfeilflieger served with the Schutztruppe (Protection Force) in German South-West Africa, now Namibia between 1914 and 1915.

Variants
Mercedes D.I engine as described
Argus As I engine span ; length ; wing area

Specifications (with Mercedes D.I engine)

References

Biplanes
1910s German aircraft
Roland Arrow
Aircraft first flown in 1914
Single-engined tractor aircraft